Lady Elizabeth Mary Finch-Hatton (née Lady Elizabeth Mary Murray; 18 May 1760 – 1 June 1825) was a British aristocrat and the subject of a notable painting, once thought to be by Johann Zoffany, now attributed to David Martin.

Biography

Early life

Murray was born on 18 May 1760 in Warsaw, Poland-Lithuania. She was the daughter of David Murray, 2nd Earl of Mansfield, by his first marriage to Countess Henrietta Frederika von Bünau. Her maternal grandfather was Count Heinrich von Bünau. It was when he was an ambassador to the Elector of Saxony, that he (by then 7th Viscount Stormont) met the beautiful Countess Henrietta Frederika, daughter of Count Heinrich von Bünau. 

They went on to be married on 16 August 1759 in Warsaw, Poland. It was a love match, Lord Mansfield himself approved and encouraged his nephew and heir on his courtship. During early years of Stormont's embassy in Vienna, the role of an Ambassador's wife was very significant, Countess Henrietta was a Saxon noblewoman in her own right therefore she could hold her own salon, which she did and with considerable aplomb. Her father Count Heinrich von Bünau himself had been an Imperial diplomat and was remembered in Vienna, therefore guaranteed Countess Henrietta's own integration to the high society of Habsburg capital. The countess was a woman of enormous charm and liveliness which captivated Prince Kaunitz, this made up for the relatively reserved and serious manner of her husband. Prince Kaunitz was the most powerful State Chancellor and close advisor to Empress Maria Theresa, therefore the Countess helped secure her husband's admission to the private circle of the Habsburg ruling family, this made Viscount Stormont’s embassy to Vienna a huge success.

The couple had 2 children, Lady Elizabeth and later Henrietta, the younger sister sadly died young in Vienna , followed closely by their mother Countess Henrietta, who died on 16 March 1766 in Vienna at the age of just 29. She was interred at the Viennese prostestant church, but her heart was removed and encased in a golden vase which accompanied the Viscount everywhere he went and later the gold vase was taken to his ancestral seat at Scone Palace.

After the death of her mother in 1766, The Viscount had a traumatic nervous breakdown and was given extended leave of absence, the love of his life had passed away and now he was left a single parent to their only daughter, unfortunately due to his ambassadorial occupation and state of mind he wasn’t able to give Elizabeth a stable upbringing or sufficient care and education, so he arranged for Lady Elizabeth to be brought up in England by his paternal uncle William Murray, 1st Earl of Mansfield and his wife, Elizabeth Finch at their estate Kenwood House. Stormont's unmarried sister Lady Anne would also came to help raise her only niece Lady Elizabeth, later Lord Mansfield would also took in his other great-niece brought from the West Indies Dido Elizabeth Belle, the illegitimate mixed-race daughter of Sir John Lindsay.

Kenwood House 
Lady Elizabeth Murray was 6 when she was brought up in Kenwood House in Hampstead, London by her father's uncle Earl of Mansfield. His father Viscount Stormont was to inherit his Uncle's title and his entire wealth including the Kenwood Estate. She was joined shortly by her illegitimate  2nd cousin Dido Elizabeth Belle, it may have been possible that Lord Mansfield took Dido Belle in order to give Lady Elizabeth a playmate, as they were around the same age. While it is known that Dido Belle had responsibility of managing the dairy and poultry yards and do some menial task for her Great Uncle, as this was a typical for ladies of the gentry, many doubt that Lady Elizabeth has anything to do with dairy and poultry yards.

In 1766, one of 2 unmarried sister of Viscount Stormont and aunt to Lady Elizabeth, Lady Anne Murray (c.1730 – 1817) would came to live at Kenwood at the same time as Lady Elizabeth and Dido Belle, they all were joined at Kenwood at a later date by the second sister Lady Marjory Murray (c. 1730 – 1799) before Lady Mansfield died.

Lady Elizabeth would also received around £100 yearly allowance from her Great Uncle while Dido received around £30. This disparity may have arisen because of Dido's race and her illegitimacy but it is also possible that Lady Elizabeth received more because her father was Lord Mansfield's heir.

Dido Belle and Lady Elizabeth Murray had a close bond during their time at Kenwood, it was noted by an American visitor Thomas Hutchinson in 1779 "A Black came in after dinner and sat with the ladies, and after coffee, walked with the company in the gardens, one of the young ladies having her arm within the other." this was also around the time when their potrait was painted by David Martin.

After 10 years of her mother's death, eventually her father Viscount Stormont remarried for a second time on 6 May 1776 at St George’s Hanover Square. His second wife being The Hon. Louisa Cathcart, daughter of Charles Cathcart, 9th Lord Cathcart. Lady Elizabeth's father often visited Elizabeth, his 2 unmarried sister, and his uncle, all whom by now reside at Kenwood House. It is known that Lady Elizabeth also regularly visited her father and her stepmom at his main home at Wandsworth Hill and their London home, as couple of letters have been found, in one of them she wrote to Mary Hamilton about the birth of Louisa’s 3rd son, Charles, in which Lady Elizabeth referred to her stepmother as "our dear Lady Stormont" indicating of warm relationship between stepmother and stepdaughter. Lady Elizabeth would write a couple more letters from Kenwood and Wandsworth to Mary Hamilton, Louisa's cousin and close friend.

In 7 August 1784 Mary Hamilton provided a tiny glimpse into how she viewed Lady Elizabeth:"went with Miss Eliza Murray to see some of her works she showed me 3 beautiful aprons she was About -- she is a remarkably nice & a good Musician for she not only plays in a Masterly manner but is a composer." from her other account of Lady Elizabeth "Miss Murray is Lord Stormont’s only child by his first wife who died when she was very young. ------ She lives with Lord Mansfield & was educated by the ye. late Lady Mansfield & two of Lord Stormont’s Sisters who also reside with Lord Mansfield. She is pleasing, good humour’d — well accomplished, & conducts herself with  that propriety which ought to distinguish a woman of fashion & good education. 

In spring 1784 The Prince of Wales had begged Mary Hamilton’s uncle to invite Mary Hamilton to attend a royal ball to which Lady Stormont was also invited. On the day of the ball, 10 March 1784, Mary Hamilton wrote in her diary that her cousin Lady Stormont had invited her stepdaughter Lady Elizabeth to the Prince’s royal ball at Carlton house, and she was present when Lady Stormont picked up Hamilton on the way to the ball in her carriage, they arrived in the royal ball together and greeted right away by the Prince of Wales. Although Lady Elizabeth was invited, Dido Belle evidently wasn't invited to the royal ball. Throughout Mary Hamilton’s diary, she had never once mentioned Dido Belle, despite her numerous visits to Kenwood and several outings with the Murray family, in which she had described all member of the Murray family including Lady Elizabeth, 2 unmarried aunts, old Lord and Lady Mansfield, the Parish Priest, etc.

From Mary Hamilton's diary, it seemed that Lady Elizabeth attended quite a few royal ball, as expected for her father and great uncle both were quite prominent aristocrats

After Lady Mansfield's death, Lady Elizabeth's 2 aunts Lady Anne and Lady Marjory would took charge of the household accounts, as they were worried for their uncle Lord Mansfield and wanted to soothe him by being his constant companion, both Anne and Marjory would also helped write their uncle's dictation when he can no longer write. Mary Hamilton also attested to their personality in her diary saying "they are very respectable characters -- sensible easy & attentive in their manner & extremely cheerful & good humour'd no airs--- their manner, & dress properly correspond to their age & situation in life. they very kindly press'd me to come again soon to Ken Wood"

During Lady Elizabeth’s time at Kenwood, her father the future 2nd Earl of Mansfield had already begun renovating Kenwood House with his uncle’s full permission,

Her father wanted to make Kenwood House a country seat like his ancestral Viscount Stormont seat Scone Palace, he added the music room and wings to Kenwood House.

Marriage 

15 December 1785, at the age of 25 Lady Elizabeth Mary Murray married George Finch-Hatton, they were married at Lord Mansfield’s town house by special license. George Finch-Hatton was from another long-established Aristocratic Finch family, George Finch-Hatton was also Lady Mansfield’s nephew. He inherited Eastwell Park in 1769 from his uncle 8th Earl of Winchilsea and Kirby Hall from his father in 1771. George Finch-Hatton also became the heir to his Grandfather titles upon the death of his unmarried cousin George Finch 9th Earl of Winchilsea.

Lady Elizabeth Murray's dowry was said to be around £17,000. The amount of £10,000 was given by Lord Mansfield and an additional of £7,000 from her father. she would also receive her aunts's wealth of £12,000 in due times. invested this would make Lady Elizabeth's wealth around £30,000.

After the wedding service performed by Archbishop of York at Mansfield’s town house, the married couple head to Kenwood for the wedding celebrations. Although there are no record of Dido Belle being at the wedding service, she would certainly be at the wedding celebrations at Kenwood. After the celebrations, Lady Elizabeth finally left Kenwood House and started her married life interchangeably at her husband 2 vast estate, Kirby Hall and Eastwell Park.

They had three children:
 Louisa Anne Hatton (d. 1 March 1875).
George Finch-Hatton, 10th Earl of Winchilsea (19 May 1791 –  8 January 1858).
 Reverend Daniel Heneage Finch-Hatton (1795 – Jan 1866).
 
Coincidentally, George Finch-Hatton's father, Edward, and the 1st Earl of Mansfield's wife, Elizabeth, were both children of Daniel Finch, 7th Earl of Winchilsea, and Anne Hatton, the sole heiress to Viscount Hatton.

Lady Elizabeth's London residence was at no.18 Hereford Street, Mayfair. it was a newly built fashionable street in Mayfair near Oxford Street and the corner of Hyde Park lane bordering north row and park street on the east. Her neighbors included Baron Ashtown at no.17, dowager Lady Mordaunt (heiress) at no.19, John Crunden architect of the complex itself at no.20, Baron Howden at no.13, Lord Grenville at no.10, Earl and Countess of Guilford, and Duke of Somerset at no.9 named Somerset house after his newly acquired title, it was the second largest house in the street.

Other notable inhabitants included the Dutch ambassador, the Dowager Countess of Darnley, Lord Seaforth, Lady Sarah Archer, Sir Alexander Craufurd and Sir John D'Oyley, Generals Morrison and Stibbert, and Colonel Hastings, and Mrs. Fitzherbert next to John Crunden at the center house in park street sandwich between Hereford street and North row, this was also the house where she secretly married the future King George IV.

Later occupants of the street would also include Countess Granville at no.13 Hereford st, Princess Charlotte of Wales and Prince Leopold of Saxe Coburg at no.10, it was the largest house in the neighbourhood named Camelford House, next to Somerset House.

From the society page of the day, Lady Elizabeth Finch-Hatton was quite a social butterfly, she socialised with people within her aristocratic circle, she also attended and hosted Balls, one of which was the Ball she arranged for her three younger daughters: “Saint James Chronicle 10 May 1817 Lady Finch Hatton’s Ball – this elegant Lady opened Mansfield House, in Portland Place, on Thursday evening, with a ball and supper. It was a juvenile party, for the express purpose of introducing the three accomplished Misses Hatton into the fashionable world.” Mansfield House in 37 Portland Place was the biggest and most luxurious townhouse in the street purchased by Lady Elizabeth's father for a staggering £8,000 in 1778, it was a house place she frequented a lot growing up. By 1817, it was already inherited by Elizabeth's brother 3rd Earl of Mansfield, Lady Elizabeth seemed to have close relationship with her half brother, as he sometimes would be educated at Kenwood House alongside Elizabeth, her brother would also named his second born daughter after Lady Elizabeth and their aunt Lady Anne Murray.

Descendants 
Elizabeth Murray was the great-grandmother of Denys Finch Hatton, known as a close friend of Danish author Karen Blixen who wrote out of Africa.

Denys's older brother was Guy Montagu George Finch-Hatton, 14th Earl of Winchilsea & 9th Earl of Nottingham, who married Margaretta Armstrong Drexel, a wealthy heiress from Drexel banking family.

She was also the ancestor of actress Anna Chancellor, her other direct descendants are currently still the holders of the title Daniel Finch-Hatton, 17th Earl of Winchilsea, The heir apparent is the present holder's son Tobias Joshua Stormont Finch-Hatton, Viscount Maidstone (born 1998).

Death
She died at Edinburgh on 1 June 1825, aged 65.

In popular culture
Let Justice Be Done by Mixed Blessings Theatre Group – a 2008 play featuring the possible influence that Elizabeth Lindsay's cousin Dido Elizabeth Belle might have had on the Somerset v Stewart ruling of 1772.
Sarah Gadon portrayed Lady Elizabeth in the film Belle (2013).

References

1760 births
1825 deaths
Daughters of British earls
Elizabeth
People from Hampstead